Ferdinand Liebermann (15 January 1883 — 28 November 1941) was a German sculptor.

Liebermann was educated at the Academy of Fine Arts in Munich. During the Third Reich he received numerous state commissions and served as artistic adviser to the city council of Munich. He sculpted numerous portrait busts of Hitler, including one for the Munich Rathaus. At the "Great German Art Exhibitions" (Große Deutsche Kunstausstellungen) in the Haus der Kunst he exhibited a total of 16 works. He also completed a bronze bust of Hitler's niece Geli Raubal, from which Hitler had numerous copies made for display in his residences.

Citations

References 
 Ferdinand Liebermann. In: Ulrich Thieme, Felix Becker et al.: Allgemeines Lexikon der Bildenden Künstler von der Antike bis zur Gegenwart. Vol. 23, E. A. Seemann, Leipzig 1929, p. 199
 Hans Vollmer: Allgemeines Lexikon der bildenden Künstler des 20. Jahrhunderts, Vol. 2, 1956, p. 228.

German sculptors
German male sculptors
Nazi culture
1883 births
1941 deaths
20th-century sculptors
Olympic competitors in art competitions
Olympic competitors for Germany